The Cyprus Stock Exchange or CSE (is a European stock exchange located in Cyprus.

History
CSE was established under the Cyprus Securities and Stock Exchange Law which provides for the development of the securities market in Cyprus and for the establishment and operation of the Cyprus Stock Exchange. It was passed by the House of Representatives in April 1993. Operations  began on March 29 1996. In 2006, it launched a common platform with the Athens Stock Exchange. The exchange is a member of the Federation of Euro-Asian Stock Exchanges.

Diversification Strategy
The exchange  allows private or public companies to list their bonds on the Emerging Companies Market (ECM) and for public companies to list their shares on the ECM. In both cases (listing of shares or bonds) the exchange will also provide the ISIN code and have the prices beamed through Bloomberg and Reuters terminals as both are official financial data vendors.

Monitoring
CySEC is responsible for the supervision and control of all CSE operations, the transactions carried out, its listed companies, brokers and brokerage firms.

See also 
 List of European stock exchanges
 List of Mideast stock exchanges
 List of stock exchanges
 List of stock exchanges in the Commonwealth of Nations

References

External links
 Homepage of the CSE

Financial services companies established in 1996
Financial services companies of Cyprus
1996 establishments in Cyprus
Companies based in Nicosia
Stock exchanges in Europe